The Blonde Hannele is a 1924 German silent film directed by Franz Seitz and starring Maria Mindzenty, Carl de Vogt, and Helena Makowska.

It was made at the Emelka Studios in Munich.

Cast

References

Bibliography

External links

1924 films
Films of the Weimar Republic
Films directed by Franz Seitz
German silent feature films
Bavaria Film films
German black-and-white films
Films shot at Bavaria Studios